Edmonton Aviators Women were a W-League club based in Edmonton, Alberta, Canada, associated with former the Men's USL team, the Edmonton Aviators. The women team folded after the 2004 season.

Year-by-year

Women's soccer clubs in Canada
Defunct USL W-League (1995–2015) teams
United Soccer League teams based in Canada
Avia
Women in Alberta
2004 disestablishments in Alberta
Association football clubs disestablished in 2004